Tapestry of Dark Souls is a fantasy horror novel by Elaine Bergstrom, set in the world of Ravenloft, and based on the Dungeons & Dragons game. It was published by TSR, Inc.

Plot summary
An order of monks are tasked to keep safe an object of unspeakable evil. The object, a tapestry, lures those of evil intentions to its threads, absorbing them. The order of monks, The Guardians, are the only line of defense against the tapestry's power. However, when a couple mysteriously arrive in the land known as Markovia they are drawn to the tapestry. After successfully stealing the tapestry, the couple make their way to the neighboring country of Tepest. Upon arriving the wife, Leith, finds out that her husband, Vhar, stole the tapestry. She becomes possessed by it, almost killing her husband and escapes to try to return the tapestry, but not before it consumes Vhar. As she makes her way back, she encounters a wolf which bites her. Even with the bite, she manages to make it back, but the tapestry has other plans for her. With the help of the Guardians, she recovers. She returns to Tepest and discovers she is pregnant. After a horrific experience, she runs to the safety of the Guardians and after having her child, she vanishes. The child, Jonathan, may be the Guardians only chance of controlling and stopping the tapestry. However, he may be the one to release its evil into the world.

Reception
Tapestry of Dark Souls introduced the first lesbian couple in a D&D/TSR world; Bergstrom has a significant gay following.

Reviews
Kliatt

References

1993 American novels
Ravenloft novels